Robert D. Marrott (born c. 1894) was a rugby union player who represented Australia.

Marrott, a hooker, claimed a total of 2 international rugby caps for Australia. His brother Bill was also an Australian rugby union representative player.

References

                   

Australian rugby union players
Australia international rugby union players
Rugby union hookers